Chlumec nad Cidlinou is a town in Hradec Králové District in the Hradec Králové Region of the Czech Republic. It has about 5,600 inhabitants.

Administrative parts
The town is made up of town parts of Chlumec nad Cidlinou I–IV and villages of Kladruby, Lučice and Pamětník.

Etymology
The town's name Chlumec is derived from the Old Czech word chlum, which meant a hill covered with forest.

Geography

It lies in a flat landscape of the East Elbe Table. The town is situated at the confluence of the rivers Cidlina and Bystřice. There are several ponds in the territory, especially north of the town. The largest of them is Chlumecký.

The nearest neighbourhood is surrounded by gardens and after it the town is sometimes nicknamed Town in gardens.

History
The first written mention of Chlumec is from 1235 in a deed of King Wenceslaus I of Bohemia. It was located on a trade route from Prague to Kłodzko Land. The village of Lučice, part of Chlumec nad Cidlinou, was first mentioned in 1110.

The Sternberg family owned Chlumec until 1393. During the first half of the 15th century, it belonged to the lords of Bergov, who had built a water castle here. After it belonged to the various nobles and changed owners several times, it was acquired by the Pernštejn family in 1521. During their rule, the estate grew significantly and prospered. The castle was fortified and new Church of Saint Ursula was built. In these times Chlumec was promoted to a town. In 1547, the Chlumec estate was bought by the royal chamber.

From 1611, Chlumec belonged to the Kinsky family. During the Thirty Years' War, the town was conquered and looted repeatedly. It was badly damaged and the castle was destroyed. After several fires, the castle was not renewed and new aristocratic residence was built – the Karlova Koruna Chateau. In the late 17th and early 18th centuries, the town recovered and crafts flourished.

The town developed rapidly before the World War I. Several public buildings were built, including the impressive Neo-Renaissance school. Until 1918, the town was a part of the Austrian Empire (Austrian side after the compromise of 1867), in the Neu-Bydzov – Nový Bydžov District, one of the 94 Bezirkshauptmannschaften in Bohemia.

Demographics

Transport
The D11 motorway runs south of the town.

Sights

The Karlova Koruna Chateau is the most notable landmark of the town. It was built for František Ferdinand Kinsky between 1721 and 1723 with the basic architectural design drafted by Jan Santini Aichel and with the participation in the building process of František Maxmilián Kaňka. The chateau is surrounded by a castle park. The castle chapel in the park is Chapel of the Blessed Virgin Mary which was built in 1741–1745.

The Church of the Holy Trinity is the oldest monument in the town. According to the foundation stone, it was built in 1134. The first written mention is from 1358. Until the early 20th century, it was a cemetery church. The building has a flat ceiling with a triangular presbytery and a wooden prismatic tower. An interior figuration came from the 17th century. Around outer presbytery walls there are placed empire styled tombs from around 1800. The church was rebuilt many times and today it is considered a styleless construction. The Zubatovská Chapel is a Neoclassical chapel from 1836–1842 is located in the former cemetery, which is today a municipal park.

Church of Saint Ursula was built in 1536–1543. It mixes late Gothic and Renaissance styles. Today's appearance is the result of repairs after three fires in the 17th century. The interior is in the Rococo style after the fire in 1774.

Notable people
Václav Kliment Klicpera (1792–1859), playwright
Josef Rumler (1922–1999), poet, literary critic, historian and translator
Ivana Loudová (1941–2017), composer
Helena Válková (born 1951), politician, professor and lawyer
Oldřich Dědek (born 1953), economist
Ladislav Vízek (born 1955), footballer
Miroslav Ouzký (born 1958), physician, politician
Miroslav Poche (born 1978), politician and economist
Václav Pilař (born 1988), footballer

Twin towns – sister cities

Chlumec nad Cidlinou is twinned with:
 Valaská, Slovakia

References

External links

Virtual show

Populated places in Hradec Králové District
Cities and towns in the Czech Republic